Vipera renardi is a species of viper, a venomous snake in the family Viperidae. The species is endemic to Asia and Eastern Europe. Five subspecies are recognized.

Etymology
The specific name, renardi, is in honor of Russian naturalist Charles Renard (1809—1886), also known as Karl Renard.

The subspecific names, bashkirovi and puzanovi, are in honor of Russian zoologists Ivan Sergeyevich Bashkirov (1900–1980) and Ivan Ivanovich Puzanov (1885–1971), respectively.

Geographic range
V. renardi is found in China, Kazakhstan, Kyrgyzstan, Mongolia, Russia, Tajikistan, Ukraine, and Uzbekistan.

Habitat

Reproduction
V. renardi is ovoviviparous.

Subspecies 
Five subspecies are recognized as being valid, including the nominotypical subspecies.
Vipera renardi bashkirovi 
Vipera renardi parursinii 
Vipera renardi puzanovi 
Vipera renardi renardi 
Vipera renardi tienshanica 

Nota bene: A trinomial authority in parentheses indicates that the subspecies was originally described in a genus other than Vipera.

References

Further reading
Cristoph H (1861). "Pelias renardi mihi ". Bulletin de la Société Impériale des Naturaliste de Moscou 34: 599–606. (Pelias renardi, new species). (in German and Latin).
Krecsák L, Tóth T (2005). "Biting among male Steppe Vipers Vipera renardi (Christoph, 1861)". Herpetozoa 18 (3/4): 188–189.
Nilson G, Andrén C (2001). "The meadow and steppe vipers of Europe and Asia — the Vipera (Acridophaga) ursinii complex". Acta Zoologica Academiae Scientiarum Hungaricae 47: 87-267. (Vipera renardi tienshanica, new subspecies, p. 204; V. r. parursinii, new subspecies, p. 208).

Vipera
Reptiles of Russia
Reptiles described in 1861